Michael Elias (born December 28, 1982) is an American baseball executive. He is the executive vice president and general manager for the Baltimore Orioles of Major League Baseball (MLB).

Career
Elias graduated from the Thomas Jefferson High School for Science and Technology in Alexandria, Virginia, where he was born. He attended Yale University, graduating in 2006. He played college baseball for the Yale Bulldogs as a pitcher. After his sophomore season, Elias required surgery to repair a torn labrum.

After graduating from Yale, Elias became a scout for the St. Louis Cardinals in 2007. When the Houston Astros hired Jeff Luhnow from the Cardinals as their general manager in 2011, Elias went to Houston with him as their director of amateur scouting. Elias is credited with the Astros' selection of Carlos Correa in the 2012 MLB draft. In 2016, after David Stearns was hired by the Milwaukee Brewers as their general manager, the Astros promoted Elias to fill Stearns' role as assistant general manager. He was given oversight of player development and minor league operations.

On November 16, 2018, the Baltimore Orioles hired Elias as their general manager and executive vice president. Elias hired Sig Mejdal from the Astros as his assistant general manager to bring analytics to the Orioles.

References

External links

Living people
1982 births
People from Alexandria, Virginia
Yale Bulldogs baseball players
Baseball pitchers
St. Louis Cardinals scouts
Houston Astros executives
Baltimore Orioles executives
Major League Baseball general managers
Thomas Jefferson High School for Science and Technology alumni